Scrappy is a cartoon film character. Scrappy may also refer to:

People
 Scrappy Blumer (1917–1997), American World War II flying ace
 Scrappy Carroll (1860–1942), American Major League Baseball player
 Scrappy Lambert (1901–1987), American jazz singer
 Scrappy Moore (American football) (1903–1971), American football coach at the University of Chattanooga
 Scrappy Moore (baseball) (1892–1964), Major League Baseball player
 Lil Scrappy, stage name of American rapper and record producer Darryl Richardson III (born 1984)

Other uses
 Scrappy-Doo, a cartoon character in the Scooby-Doo franchise also known as Scrappy
 Scrappy Mouse, a Mighty Mouse sidekick in the animated television series Mighty Mouse: The New Adventures
 Scrappy the Eagle, mascot of the University of North Texas

Lists of people by nickname